The John Brown House is the first mansion built in Providence, Rhode Island, located at 52 Power Street on College Hill where it borders the campus of Brown University. The house is named after the original owner, one of the early benefactors of the university, merchant, statesman, and slave trader John Brown. It was declared a National Historic Landmark in 1968. John Quincy Adams considered it "the most magnificent and elegant private mansion that I have ever seen on this continent."

History
The building was designed by John Brown's brother Joseph, an amateur architect who had also designed the First Baptist Church in America. It was built between 1786 and 1788. Notable guests during this time include George Washington, who is reported to have visited for tea.

The house was sold in 1901 to Rhode Island industrialist and banker Marsden J. Perry. Perry renovated the extension to add in modern bathrooms and central heating systems. John Nicholas Brown purchased it in 1936. In 1942, the Brown family donated the house to the Rhode Island Historical Society for preservation, and the society restored it to its original colonial decor. The museum now contains many original furniture pieces provided by the Brown family estate.

Description
The house is a three-story brick structure with a hipped roof topped by a flat section. Both the main roof line and the flat section are ringed by a low balustrade. Four chimneys rise from the sides of the house, and its main entrance is in a center projecting section topped by a small triangular pediment. The entry is sheltered by a portico supported by sandstone Doric columns, and there is a Palladian window above the portico. The interior of the house follows a traditional Georgian plan, with a central hallway flanked by two rooms on either side. The hall is particularly grand, with engaged columns supporting architectural busts and a two-stage stairwell with an ornate twisting banister. Richly detailed woodwork is evident in all of the public rooms. Eleven of the building's twelve mantelpieces are original.

Gallery

See also

National Register of Historic Places listings in Providence, Rhode Island
List of National Historic Landmarks in Rhode Island

References

External links

Rhode Island Historical Society - John Brown House

Houses on the National Register of Historic Places in Rhode Island
National Historic Landmarks in Rhode Island
Historic house museums in Rhode Island
Georgian architecture in Rhode Island
Houses completed in 1786
Museums in Providence, Rhode Island
Biographical museums in Rhode Island
Houses in Providence, Rhode Island
Historic American Buildings Survey in Rhode Island
National Register of Historic Places in Providence, Rhode Island
Individually listed contributing properties to historic districts on the National Register in Rhode Island